Aldo-keto reductase family 7 member A3 is a protein that in humans is encoded by the AKR7A3 gene.

Function

Aldo-keto reductases, such as AKR7A3, are involved in the detoxification of aldehydes and ketones.[supplied by OMIM, Apr 2004].

References

External links 
 PDBe-KB provides an overview of all the structure information available in the PDB for Human Aflatoxin B1 aldehyde reductase member 3 (AKR7A3)

Further reading